Arion occultus is a species of small air-breathing land slug, a terrestrial pulmonate gastropod mollusk in the family Arionidae, the roundback slugs.

Distribution
This species occurs in:

 Ireland; appears to be introduced  in Ireland, but its country of origin is not known.

Description
This recently recognized species is part of the "Arion hortensis group" of species. It somewhat resembles Arion distinctus in general appearance, and also resembles Arion alpinus, but the internal anatomy of the reproductive system is different.

References

External links 

 Description in AnimalBase (taxonomy,short description, distribution, biology,status (threats), images)

Arion (gastropod)
Gastropods described in 2004